is a district of Shibuya, Tokyo, Japan.

The 57th Prime Minister of Japan Nobusuke Kishi (1896–1987) and the 66th Prime Minister of Japan Takeo Miki (1907–1988) owned their residences there.

Geography
Nanpeidaichō borders Dōgenzaka and Shinsenchō in the north, Sakuragaokachō to the east, Hachiyamachō and Uguisudanichō to the south, and Aobadai to the west.

Places of interest

Embassies
 Embassy of Malaysia (Nanpeidaichō 20)
 Embassy of the United Arab Emirates (Nanpeidaichō 9-10)
 Embassy of the Philippines (Nanpeidaichō 11-24; annex building)

Other
 Headquarters of Tokyu Corporation (Nanpeidaichō 5-6)
 Headquarters of Yomeishu (Nanpeidaichō 16-25)

Education
 operates public elementary and junior high schools.

All of Nanpeidaicho is zoned to Jinnan Elementary School (神南小学校), and Shoto Junior High School (松濤中学校).

References

Neighborhoods of Tokyo
Districts of Shibuya